O Tau is a village in Sai Kung District, Hong Kong.

Administration
O Tau is a recognized village under the New Territories Small House Policy.

References

External links
 Delineation of area of existing village O Tau (Sai Kung) for election of resident representative (2019 to 2022)

Villages in Sai Kung District, Hong Kong